The 2010–11 Luxembourg Cup was the 86th season of Luxembourg's annual cup competition. It began on 29 August 2010 with Round 1 and ended on 29 May 2011 with the Final held at a neutral venue. The winners of the competition will qualify for the second qualifying round of the 2011–12 UEFA Europa League. FC Differdange 03 are the defending champions, having won their first ever cup title last season.

Calendar

Round 1
Fifty teams from Division 2 (IV) and Division 3 (V) entered in this round. Thirty-six of them competed in matches, with the other fourteen teams were awarded a bye. The games were played on August 29. 2010.

Bye: Alisontia Steinsel, Blo-Weiss Itzig, FC Brouch, FC Lorentzweiler, FC Kopstal 33, Jeunesse Gilsdorf, Jeunesse Useldange, Kischpelt Wilwerwiltz, Minière Lasauvage, Syra Mensdorf, Titus Lamadelaine, US Folschette, US Rambrouch, Yellow Boys Weiler-la-Tour

Round 2
The eighteen winners of Round 1 and the fourteen teams that received a bye competed in this round. The games were played on September 5, 2010.

Round 3
The sixteen winners of Round 2 will compete in this round, as well as twenty-eight teams from Division 1 (III), which enter the competition in this round. The games will be played on 10 October 2010.

Round 4
The twenty-two winners of Round 3 will compete in this round, as well as fourteen teams from the Division of Honour (II), which enter the competition in this round. The games will be played on 7 November 2010.

Round 5
The eighteen winners of Round 4 will compete in this round, as well as the fourteen teams from the National Division, which enter the competition in this round. The games will be played on 3 April 2011.

Round 6
The sixteen winners of Round 5 compete in this round. The games will be played on 22 April 2011.

Quarterfinals
The eight winners from Round 6 will compete in the quarterfinals, to be held on 4 May 2011.

Semifinals
The four quarterfinal winners will compete in the semifinals, to be held on 24 and 25 May 2011.

Final

External links
 Official page 
 Private homepage about everything regarding Luxembourg soccer 

Luxembourg Cup seasons
Luxembourg Cup
Cup